Challoor is a village located in Karimnagar district, Telangana, India. It is located 30 km from the city of Karimnagar to the southeast, and 75 km from Komuravelli Mallanna temple.

Villages in Karimnagar district